Rothwell, Hick and Rothwell was an engineering company in Bolton, England. Set up in 1822, the partners became interested in the production of steam locomotives after the Rainhill Trials. The company's first engine was Union, a vertical boiler,  with horizontal cylinders for the Bolton and Leigh Railway of which Hick and Rothwell were promoters and original shareholders, followed by three more locomotives the following year for American railways.

Rothwell and Company
In 1832, Benjamin Hick left to set up his own business, B. Hick and Sons, to be replaced by Benjamin Cubitt, (younger brother of William Cubitt) from Fenton, Murray and Jackson. The firm then became Rothwell and Company. A further order for America was fulfilled in 1833, then for a couple of years the firm was occupied with pumps and stationary engines.

Locomotives, steam engines and cranes

1820s
About 1827 the company supplied three steam engines to André Koechlin & Cie in France, one for the Mulhouse cotton mill for which Sharp, Roberts and Co. supplied most of the equipment, one for coal mines at Ronchamp, and one for the Bourcart factory. Hick attended at least two of these installations in person during 1827.

A 1:10 scale model of a double jib crane designed by Benjamin Hick is displayed at the Musee des Arts et Metiers.

1830s
From 1836 steam locomotives became their main business. Up to 1840 they produced 56, 28 of which went abroad. This had  drivers, with a swivelling front bogie, and reputed to have worked for 35 years. A deal of sub-contract work came from Edward Bury and Company.

1840s
From 1841, the company began a batch of  engines for the broad gauge Great Western Railway. The largest order came in 1847 for 28  engines for the London and South Western Railway.

1850s
Possibly the most remarkable were some 4-2-4 engines for the Bristol and Exeter Railway built in 1853/4 with  unflanged driving wheels, and two ball-and-socket swivelled bogies.

The quality of the company's products brought in repeat orders. Many of the engines were still in service twenty years later. From 1857 the engines were to Alexander Allan's design and were similar to the Old Crewe type. These were sold to the Lancaster and Carlisle Railway and  the Eastern Counties Railway.

The last to be built were four broad gauge engines for the Bristol and Exeter Railway and two saddle tanks for the Carmarthen and Cardigan Railway.

Closure
In the face of reduced business and increasing competition, the company closed in 1864. Part of the works was taken over by the Bolton Iron and Steel Company, which was later absorbed by  Henry Bessemer and Company in 1906.

See also
 Samuel Crompton
 Robert Daglish Jr. - trained with Hick and Rothwell
 Perseverance (1829) - similar in layout to Union by Rothwell, Hick & Co.
 Pontchartrain Railroad
 List of Saxon locomotives and railcars
 List of Liverpool and Manchester Railway locomotives
 GWR Leo Class
 Abbey Mills Pumping Station
 W & J Galloway & Sons

References

 Lowe, J.W., (1989) British Steam Locomotive Builders, Guild Publishing

External links
 Internet Archive Rothwell, Hick and Rothwell Low Pressure engine, p.741-743

Locomotive manufacturers of the United Kingdom
Manufacturing companies established in 1822
1864 disestablishments in the United Kingdom
History of Bolton
Companies disestablished in the 1860s
Companies based in Bolton
1822 establishments in England
British companies established in 1822